In molecular biology, group II pyridoxal-dependent decarboxylases are family of enzymes including aromatic-L-amino-acid decarboxylase (L-dopa decarboxylase or tryptophan decarboxylase) , which catalyses the decarboxylation of tryptophan to tryptamine,  tyrosine decarboxylase , which converts tyrosine into tyramine and histidine decarboxylase , which catalyses the decarboxylation of histidine to histamine.

Pyridoxal-5'-phosphate-dependent amino acid decarboxylases can be divided into four groups based on amino acid sequence. Group II includes glutamate, histidine, tyrosine, and aromatic-L-amino-acid decarboxylases.

See also
Group I pyridoxal-dependent decarboxylases
Group III pyridoxal-dependent decarboxylases
Group IV pyridoxal-dependent decarboxylases

References

Protein families